The 810s decade ran from January 1, 810, to December 31, 819.

Significant people
 Al-Amin the Arab caliph
 Al-Ma'mun of Arab Caliphate
 Al-Shafi'i
 Charlemagne
 Michael I Rangabe of Byzantium
 Louis the Pious
 Leo V of Byzantium
 Sulayman ibn Abi Ja'far

References